Pavilions Shopping Centre may refer to:

Pavilions Birmingham, in Birmingham, England
The Pavilions in Uxbridge, London, England
Swords Pavilions